Ernst von Klipstein (3 February 1908 – 22 November 1993) was a German film and television actor. von Klipstein became a prominent actor during the Nazi era, appearing in a large number of action films.

Partial filmography

 Uproar in Damascus (1939) - Gefreiter von Elmendonck
 The Governor (1939) - Leutnant Robert Runeberg
 Escape in the Dark (1939) - Chemiker Dr. Paul Gildemeister
 The Merciful Lie (1939) - Dr.Thomas Clausen
 Midsummer Night's Fire (1939) - Georg
 Legion Condor (1939)
 The Three Codonas (1940) - Lalo Codona
 Blutsbrüderschaft (1941) - Fliegerleutnant Jochen Wendler
 Unser kleiner Junge (1941) - Janke
 Stukas (1941) - Oberleutnant "Patzer" von Bomberg
 Alarmstufe V (1941) - Richard Haller
 Wedding in Barenhof (1942) - Ulanenoffizier Lothar von Pütz
 Stimme des Herzens (1942) - Paul Ohlsen
 5 June (1942) - Oberleutnant Lebsten
 The Second Shot (1943) - Franz von Gerlach
 The Crew of the Dora (1943) - Hauptmann Kurt Gillhausen
 Das schwarze Schaf (1944)
 Summer Nights (1944) - Kuno
 Aufruhr der Herzen (1944)
 Schicksal am Strom (1944) - Jürg Petersen, Steuermann
 Das alte Lied (1945) - Graf Erwin Haldem
 Heidesommer (1945) - Bernhard
 Thank You, I'm Fine (1948) - Tierarzt Dokter Höflin
 Trouble Backstairs (1949) - Assessor Dr. Erich Horn
 Die drei Dorfheiligen (1949) - Lehrer
 Erzieherin gesucht (1950) - Achim Terbrügge
 Ripening Youth (1955) - Studienrat Baumbauer
 The Barrings (1955) - Dr. Bremer
 Two Blue Eyes (1955) - Feigl, Ingenieur
 In Hamburg When the Nights Are Long (1956)
 Skandal um Dr. Vlimmen (1956) - Dr. Treeborg
 Nothing But Blondes (1957) - Doctor
 Madeleine und der Legionär (1958)
 Stalingrad: Dogs, Do You Want to Live Forever? (1959) - Ein General
 The Stuff That Dreams Are Made Of (1972) - Thomas Hem

Bibliography
 Baird, Jay W. To Die for Germany: Heroes in the Nazi Pantheon. Indiana University Press, 1990.

External links

1908 births
1993 deaths
German male film actors
German male television actors
Actors from Poznań
People from the Province of Posen
20th-century German male actors